Kirsten Rolffes (20 September 1928 – 10 April 2000) was a Danish actress, internationally mostly recognized for her roles in The Kingdom and Matador. She also had a leading role in Denmark's first sitcom, Een stor familie (One big family), set in an early 1980s office building. She attended drama school at Frederiksberg Theater (1947-48) and at the National Theater (Kongelige teater; 1948-50).

Career
Her role in the country's first soap opera Landsbyen (The Village) helped cement her fame in her native country. She also worked in animation, voicing Ursula in the Danish language version of Disney's The Little Mermaid, Maleficent in the Danish dub of Sleeping Beauty, the Fairy Godmother in the Danish dub of Cinderella and the Evil Queen in the Danish dub of Snow White and the Seven Dwarves. She also acted on stage at the National Theater (Det kongelige teater) between 1950-63 and 1988-94.

Honors
She was knighted in 1990 by Queen Margrethe II for her services to the theatrical arts.

Death
After fighting breast cancer and having multiple surgical operations, she conceded to the disease and halted treatment in 1995. She died in 2000  in Copenhagen, survived by her three children, and is interred in Garrison Cemetery.

Filmography

External links
 
 Dansk Kvindebiografisk Leksikon om Kirsten Rolffes 
 Danish Female Biographical Lexicon for Kirsten Rolffes 

1928 births
2000 deaths
20th-century Danish actresses
Danish voice actresses
Danish television actresses
Danish stage actresses
Soap opera actresses
Best Actress Bodil Award winners
Actresses from Copenhagen
Deaths from cancer in Denmark
Deaths from breast cancer
Best Actress Robert Award winners
Burials at the Garrison Cemetery, Copenhagen